Jonas Andersson may refer to:

 Jonas Andersson (archer) (born 1979), Swedish archer
 Jonas Andersson (ice hockey) (born 1981), ice hockey player
 Jonas Andersson (swimmer) (born 1984), Swedish swimmer
 Jonas Andersson (speedway rider) (born 1990) in 2009 Individual Speedway Junior European Championship
 Jonas Andersson (co-driver) (born 1977), Swedish rally co-driver
Jonas Andersson (politician, born 1972), Swedish politician known as Jonas Andersson i Skellefteå
 Jonas Andersson (politician, born 1989), Swedish politician known as Jonas Andersson i Linghem or Jonas Andersson i Linköping

See also
 Jonas Anderson (born 1972), Swedish singer in Thailand